All Star Comedy Carnival was an annual Christmas-special produced by ITV, containing new mini-episodes of popular British sitcoms and light entertainment programmes with some musical interludes. This was broadcast annually on 25 December on ITV, from 1969 to 1973. It was hosted by Des O'Connor in 1969, Max Bygraves in 1970, Mike and Bernie Winters in 1971 and Jimmy Tarbuck in 1972 and 1973, All Star Comedy Carnvial was a direct competitor to the BBC's Christmas Night with the Stars. All had short five-minute sketches devised and produced for transmission within the festive period, written by the original writers of each comedy series.

Sitcoms featured
1969: Presented by Des O'Connor
Doctor in the House 
Mr Digby Darling
Cribbins
Please Sir!
Never Mind the Quality, Feel the Width
Jokers Wild
On the Buses
Father Dear Father
Two in Clover
The Dustbinmen
Coronation Street
Dear Mother...Love Albert
Mike Yarwood

1970: Presented by Max Bygraves.  This edition was recorded and transmitted in black-and-white due to the ITV Colour Strike.
Girls About Town
The Worker
The Des O'Connor Show
Coronation Street
The Lovers
Hark at Barker
Doctor in the House 
Jokers Wild
Dear Mother...Love Albert
Albert and Victoria
For the Love of Ada
Cribbins
Father Dear Father

1971: Presented by Mike and Bernie Winters
Doctor at Large
The Lovers
And Mother Makes Three
His and Hers
Please Sir!
The Fenn Street Gang
Girls About Town
Dear Mother...Love Albert
Sez Les
Lollipop Loves Mr. Mole
Father Dear Father

1972: Presented by Jimmy Tarbuck
 Love Thy Neighbour 
 On The Buses
 Christmas With Wogan
 Nearest and Dearest
 Thirty Minutes Worth 
 Sez Les
 The Fenn Street Gang
 Father Dear Father

1973: Presented by Jimmy Tarbuck
 Man About The House 
 Billy Liar
 My Good Woman 
 Spring and Autumn
 Doctor in Charge

References

External links

British variety television shows
Christmas television specials
ITV (TV network) original programming
1972 in British television